Mattress Lot is a privately owned mattress and home furnishings retailer based in Portland, Oregon.  The company was founded on January 2, 2010, by Michael and Mary Ruth Hanna, husband and wife.  Mattress Lot carries mattresses manufactured by Oregon Mattress Company, Sound Sleep Products and Easy Rest.  Mattress Lot also carries platform beds and furniture from Night and Day Furniture.

Mattress Lot is possibly the first mattress retailer in the US to offer mattress delivery by bicycle.  Mattress Lot offers customers a discount if they arrive on a bicycle. Mattress Lot specializes in natural, sustainable latex mattresses and locally-made mattresses, capitalizing on the growing "buy-local" movement.

Shortly after Mattress Lot opened for business, Pulitzer Prize-winning author Tom Hallman wrote a lengthy profile of Mattress Lot founder Michael Hanna. Hallman's article appeared in The Oregonian in June 2010.

History
Michael Hanna was laid off from Comcast Cable in May 2009.  The Portland couple borrowed $8,000 and bought a truckload of Sealy Factory 2nd mattresses. They leased space inside an out-of-business car dealership, and opened Mattress Lot on January 2, 2010. The business turned a profit within the first six months. Owner, Michael Hanna, went on to speak about his experience at a Ted X Conference held at Concordia University.

In May 2011, Mattress Lot trademarked the logo and slogan "A Lot More Mattress for Less". In the same month, they were named 'Dealer of the Year' by Oregon Mattress Company.

References

External links
 

Companies based in Portland, Oregon
Retail companies established in 2010
Mattress retailers of the United States
2010 establishments in Oregon